Muley Xeque ( Mawlay al-Shaykh) was a Moroccan prince, born in Marrakech in 1566 and died in Vigevano (Lombardy, Italy) in 1621. Exiled in Spain, he was converted to Catholicism in Madrid and was known as Felipe de África, Philip of Africa or Philip of Austria, in addition to the nickname of The Black Prince.

He was the son of Saadi Sultan Abdallah Mohammed, who after reigning between 1574 and 1576 was dethroned by his uncle, Abd al-Malik (1576-1578). Aided by Portuguese troops under the command of King Sebastian of Portugal, al-Mutawakkil faced his rival on August 4, 1578 in the Battle of the Three Kings, which resulted in the defeat of the Portuguese and which killed three monarchs, giving way to the reign of Ahmad al-Mansur, the brother of Abd al-Malik.

Muley Xeque arrived to Spain at the age of 12.
After a stay in Portugal, he lived in Carmona from 1589 to 1593. According to Lope de Vega, who was his personal friend and whose comedy El bautismo del príncipe de Marruecos is part of what we know about the character, Muley Xeque decided to leave Islam after attending in Andújar to the procession of the Virgen de la Cabeza.

On November 3, 1593 he was baptized in the Monastery of San Lorenzo de El Escorial, sponsored by Philip II, after whom he was named. He was made a grandee of Spain and Commander of the Order of Santiago.

He was well acquainted with Madrid's high society of the time. He lived in a mansion at the corner of Huertas and Príncipe streets (named after him) in the place currently known as Santoña Palace. His friend, Lope de Vega, dedicated his sonnet 148 to him.

Upon the expulsion of the Moriscos, the presence of a former Muslim in the court became uncomfortable, so Muley Xeque moved to the Spanish possessions in Italy.  There he died in Vigevano, near Milan, where he was allegedly buried, but his exact resting place is unknown. A chronicler of Vigevano, Matteo di Cherasco Gianolio, picked up the eventful life of Muley Xeque in a book called the Memorie storiche intorno la vita del real principe di Marocco Muley-Xeque, another of the historical sources on the life of this character.

Calle del Príncipe ("Prince Street") in Madrid and Calle Felipe de África in Valdemorillo, where he lived some time before his baptism, are said to be named after him. In Getafe, there is another street of the same name, not about Muley Xeque, but another Moroccan prince who, years later, was baptised with the same name.
The Madrid chronicler Mesonero Romanos rejects the claim about Calle del Príncipe, pointing out that the name was already in use in 1568, Muley did not reach Spain until at least 1580 and was not a prince until his baptism in 1593.

References
 Jaime Oliver Asin, Life of Don Felipe in Africa, Prince of Fez and Morocco (1556-1621), Madrid, 1956. 
 Bunes Michelangelo Ibarra and Beatriz Alonso Steel, Muley Xeque in the court of Philip II, Daniel Gil Flores (ed.), De Mayrit to Madrid: Madrid and the Arabs, the ninth century to century, Barcelona, 2011.
 Ahmed Mohamed Mgara: http://ecodetetuan.blogspot.com.br/2011/05/mulay-ech-cheij-el-llamado-don-felipe.html

Converts to Roman Catholicism from Islam
Moroccan former Muslims
Moroccan Roman Catholics
Grandees of Spain
Saadi dynasty
People from Marrakesh
Moroccan expatriates in Spain
Moroccan expatriates in Portugal
Moroccan expatriates in Italy
16th-century Moroccan people
Moroccan princes
Moroccan exiles
People from Vigevano
1566 births
1621 deaths
16th-century Arabs